WFG may refer to:
Wait-For Graph
Waveform generator
World Financial Group